Rhys Thompson (born 19 July 1996) is an English international judoka. He has represented England at the Commonwealth Games and won a bronze medal.

Biography
Thompson is a double British champion, winning the half-heavyweight title at the British Judo Championships in 2018 and 2021. He has twice won medals at the European Open. 

In 2022, he was selected for the 2022 Commonwealth Games in Birmingham where he competed in the men's 100 kg, winning the bronze medal. At the 2022 British National Championships he successfully defended his -100kg title.

References

External links
 
 

1996 births
Living people
English male judoka
British male judoka
Judoka at the 2022 Commonwealth Games
Commonwealth Games competitors for England
Commonwealth Games bronze medallists for England
Commonwealth Games medallists in judo
Medallists at the 2022 Commonwealth Games